is a 2,493-seat performing arts venue located in Yokohama, Japan. The complex opened in 1975. Many international artists have performed at Kanagawa Kenmin Hall, including Linda Ronstadt, King Crimson, Chicago, Cheap Trick, Alanis Morissette, The Black Crowes, The Doobie Brothers, Diana Ross and Paul Rodgers.

References

1975 establishments in Japan
Buildings and structures completed in 1975